Life imprisonment is one of the five principal punishments stipulated in Article 33 of the Criminal Law of the People's Republic of China. In the Criminal Law, there are 87 penalties for life imprisonment.

Life imprisonment also deprives political rights for life. If the sentence is commuted, the deprivation of political rights will be changed to three to ten years. (Article 57) The term of prosecution shall be 20 years for crimes with the maximum life imprisonment prescribed by law. The extension under special circumstances shall be subject to the approval of the Supreme People's Procuratorate. (Article 87, paragraph 4)

If there is no intentional crime at the end of the probation period after the death sentence is suspended, the sentence shall automatically be commuted to life imprisonment (or fixed-term imprisonment of twenty-five years). (Article 50) Life imprisonment may be commuted, and the actual sentence shall not be less than 13 years. If the death penalty with a suspension of execution is converted to life imprisonment, the actual execution shall not be less than 25 years (Article 78). The actual time limit for execution shall be calculated by the commutation award (Article 80). Article 78 of the Criminal Law stipulates the conditions for commutation. If a person has been sentenced to life imprisonment for more than 13 years, he may be released on parole under certain conditions. No parole shall be granted to recidivists and other serious violent crimes who are sentenced to life imprisonment (Article 81). The probation period for parole of life imprisonment is 10 years (Article 83). If the death penalty is suspended for corruption, the court may concurrently sentence him to life imprisonment after the expiration of the sentence, without commutation or parole.

On November 15, 2016, the Supreme People's Court issued the Provisions on the Specific Application of Laws in Handling Cases of Commutation and Parole, which stipulates that any prisoner convicted for corruption and bribery who are imprisoned for life cannot be commuted or paroled again. This regulation come into force on January 1, 2017.

Although life imprisonment does not exist as a mandatory punishment in China, the following crimes may carry life imprisonment:

Arson 

In February 2018, a Chinese nanny in the Chinese city of Hangzhou was found guilty of intentionally setting fire to a mother and her three children. She was sentenced to death. Her gambling debts are crippling her, and she plots to blackmail her hostess by starting the fire in order to "rescue" her family's home from being destroyed by the flames. In this case, however, the victim and her three children perished as a result of the fire. Because the victim's husband, a father of three children, was away on business, a mother and three children died in the horrible accident that occurred (BBC NEWS, 2018). Arson is an extremely serious crime in China, and it can result in life imprisonment or even the death penalty if it is committed. The crime of arson is classed as "the offence of compromising public safety," according to Article 106 of the "Criminal Law of the People's Republic of China." Anyone who causes major injury, death, or significant damage of public or private property through the use of arson, floods, explosion, poisoning, or other dangerous techniques will be condemned to a fixed-term jail sentence under the Criminal Code. 10 years or more in prison, life imprisonment, or the death penalty are all possibilities. Lin Shuqiang was executed in June 1995 in Zhuhai County, Guangdong Province, according to Amnesty International's China: Death Penalty Record: January-June 1995 report. He was sentenced to death for arson and robbery. Wei Dirong, a resident of Shaanxi Province, was also killed in June 1995 for setting fire to equipment. The database also includes a number of executions for arson and other crimes that took place around China. Consider the case of Cheng Zilong, who was hanged in Anhui Province in February 1995 for poisoning cattle and sentenced to a year in prison for setting fire to hay and melon fields, among other offences. Chen Xiaoming was condemned to death in February 1995 for setting fire to two individuals in Dongtai County, Jiangsu Province. The incident occurred in February 1995. (Immigration and Refugee Board & Research Directorate, 1996). Several years ago, two employees of a relocation business in Shanghai were sentenced to death with a two-year reprieve and another to life in jail for setting fire to a block of apartments that needed to be transported, killing an elderly couple in the process. After a two-year delay, the Shanghai No. 1 Intermediate People's Court condemned two employees of the Shanghai Chengkai Housing Relocation Co., Ltd. to death for the crime of arson in the first instance, with the possibility of a two-year delay if the case goes to trial. Another firm employee was sentenced to life imprisonment for the identical offence by a different court of law (Jiao, 2005). These cases fully demonstrate that China has already implemented life imprisonment for arson.

Murder 

China is a country that uses the death penalty. China's transition to a market economy has been implemented on a broad scale, so many crimes punishable by death have gradually turned into life sentences. Murder is mentioned in the execution list as part of putting someone's life in grave danger. But with the progress of Chinese society, the death penalty was gradually replaced by life imprisonment. In China, many people sentenced to death for murder will have their sentences commuted to suspended or life sentences, depending on the country's socio-economic development. Those who did not intentionally commit crimes during their stay in the country shall be commuted to life imprisonment after the expiration of the two-year term; those who have made significant contributions shall be commuted to fixed-term imprisonment (Lu & Zhang, 2005). In China, murder has traditionally been classified as a crime punishable by death or life imprisonment. The death penalty in China has changed dramatically since the early 1980s. The death penalty added to China's 1997 law tends to be related to public safety, economic order and corruption. Terrorism, hijacking and gun control are crimes against public safety under the new law (Guo & Ma, n.d.). Those who have committed murder in China while being under the age of 18 are subject to the maximum legal penalty, which is life in jail without the possibility of parole. The legislation in China permits a form of life imprisonment that can be upgraded to life imprisonment without the possibility of parole. If the crime was committed by an adult, which is punishable by life imprisonment, which is a legal sentence under Chinese law for a large number of crimes, then individuals who were between the ages of 14 and 18 at the time of the crime may be sentenced to life imprisonment. This is provided that the crime is committed by an adult, which is punishable by life imprisonment (Life Imprisonment of Children, n.d. ). In the case of the arson committed by the nanny in Hangzhou in 2018, the culprit was also responsible for the deliberate destruction of the employer's home by arson, which led to the deaths of an adult and three children, and she was sentenced to life in prison for her crimes (BBC NEWS, 2018). "Recidivists and criminals who have been sentenced to fixed-term imprisonment of more than 10 years or life imprisonment for violent crimes such as homicide, bombing, and robbery shall not be granted parole," Article 82, Paragraph 2 of the Criminal Law states. "Recidivists and criminals who have been sentenced to life imprisonment for violent crimes such as homicide, bombing, and robbery shall not be granted parole." This Act makes it illegal for some violent criminals to perform their crimes. In China, parole is subject to a number of different conditions (Guo & Ma, n.d.). The policy of life imprisonment without the possibility of release that is mandated by Chinese law for those convicted of murder is helpful in minimizing the number of homicides that occur in China and maintaining social harmony and order.

Corruption 

The fight against corruption in China is being waged on two fronts simultaneously. On the one hand, corruption is still a severe challenge for both the party and the state. This is not simply due to the fact that corruption results in the loss of public assets; rather, it is also due to the fact that corruption erodes the regime's legitimacy. On the other hand, when compared to the problems that exist in certain other nations, China's level of corruption does not appear to be particularly severe. In China, the central government is unable and unwilling to examine the majority of its officials, especially senior officials. As a result, it chooses to impose heavy punishment on senior officials who have pleaded guilty instead. Despite the fact that this policy of selective discipline diminishes the state's prestige in the battle against corruption, it still implies that corrupt officials confront uncertainty, and even senior officials do not necessarily escape punishment in all cases. The current Criminal Law of China has been revised to implement a system of life imprisonment without the possibility of commutation or parole for death row inmates who have been convicted of the most heinous crime of corruption and bribery. This system will not apply to death row inmates who have been sentenced to death. Due to the immaturity of relevant legislation, theoretical circles are divided on the nature, application methods, and scope of life imprisonment. However, the establishment of a life imprisonment system is conducive to reducing the public's fear of the death penalty, which in turn promotes the abolition of the death penalty. In Chinese society, one of the most important problems that has persisted for a long time is that of governmental corruption. It is simple for government officials in China to become corrupt due to the country's socioeconomic system and the tyranny of a single party. The Chinese government has upped the severity of the punishments by including bribery of government officials on a list of offenses that carry a sentence of life in prison (Zhu, 2015). According to the findings of recent research, the huge network of government officials, bank insiders, and criminal businesses involved in fraud is a significant part of the problem of fraud and corruption in Chinese banks. It is not true that China's more stringent legal system has inevitably resulted in a more successful fight against bank fraud. Fraud can be deterred by laws, their enforcement, and the imposition of penalties in a way that is both unknown and predictable. Disparities in politics, ideology, and the law make it difficult for China to track down criminals who have fled the country (Cheng & Ma, 2009). The trial of Bo Xilai, a former secretary of China's Chongqing Municipal Party Committee, is the most typical example of China's imposition of life sentences for corruption. Bo Xilai was sentenced to life in prison for his involvement in a series of political scandals. On September 22, 2013, the Jinan Intermediate People's Court sentenced Bo Xilai to life in prison on allegations of taking 20 million yuan ($3.3 million) in bribes. These charges date back to around 5 million yuan ($817,000) for embezzlement during his time serving as mayor of Dalian. In addition to this, the judge ordered that all of his property as well as his political rights be taken away from him permanently. The approach of the leadership of the Communist Party to the case of Bo Xilai has been to characterize it as a straightforward criminal investigation rather than a political struggle. The decision against Bo Xilai was hailed as a success for the anti-corruption movement in China by the country's official news outlets. The career of Bo Xilai is an illustration of how corrupt officials in China frequently gain several promotions without any apparent concern of being investigated for illegal activity. The Chinese government is strong and determined to punish corrupt activity, and the trial of Bo Xilai's case illustrates that strength and determination (Zhu, 2015).

Drug trafficking 

Since China's economic reforms, there has been a significant rise in drug-related criminal activity. The Chinese government has enacted and altered a number of new laws as well as official instructions in order to address the increasing number of new crimes. When it comes to drug offenses, the Chinese government has never been shy about applying harsh punishments, including the possibility of a sentence of life in prison or even the death penalty, depending on the gravity of the situation. Since the early 2000s, China's criminal justice system has been undergoing a criminal shift toward leniency, which has greatly reduced the degree of punishment. Historically, China's criminal justice system has been characterized by harsh punishments; however, since the early 2000s, China has been undergoing a criminal shift toward leniency (Zhu, 2015). The shift in punishment can be seen as the emergence of a more contemporary kind of punishment policy, which draws inspiration from China's recently implemented "harmonious society" program (Trevakes, 2013). Drug trafficking in China is a criminal offense that can result in the death penalty, and the country has been implementing stringent measures to combat the problem. For instance, in accordance with Article 347 of the Criminal Law of the People's Republic of China, those who are found guilty of smuggling, trafficking, transporting, or manufacturing heroin and methamphetamine in quantities of over 50 grams but less than 15 grams are subject to a sentence of imprisonment for a set period of time. On the other hand, those who are found guilty under more severe circumstances are subject to a sentence of either life imprisonment or the death penalty. Additionally, corpses found to be in possession of illegal substances face severe punishments in China. According to the findings of various studies, there were a total of 1,508 incidents involving the practice of corpse packing. These cases involved 1,541 routes and 2,028 defendants who were captured corpse packers. It was also necessary to code the outcome of each arrested corpse packer's punishment, which may be either a term of incarceration, life imprisonment, or the death penalty. The Chinese government chose captured body packers and trafficking routes as the unit of analysis because each case may contain information on more than one route or perpetrator. Additionally, because not all criminals were involved in body packing or were sentenced in the same case, each case may contain information on more than one route or perpetrator. In a manner analogous to the investigation of drug trafficking routes, it was found that corpse packers who were apprehended on international routes carried a greater quantity of drugs, and that those who were apprehended internationally or across provinces were more likely to conceal drugs in their luggage. Body snatchers who are found in the province face harsher punishments at the hands of the Chinese government. These punishments include increased rates of life imprisonment, the loss of property, and the denial of political rights. All of these are completely reflective of the life sentence sanctions that China has for drug trafficking (Ruoyang & Tianji, 2020).

References

Sources
Criminal Law and Criminal Procedure Law in the People's Republic of China
 Bei Guo, Ying Jiang. (2015). Analyzing the coexistence of emerging transparency and tight political control on Weibo. Journal of International Communication 21:1, pages 78-108.
 Cambridge Dictionary. (2022, May 25). life imprisonment. @CambridgeWords. https://dictionary.cambridge.org/zhs/%E8%AF%8D%E5%85%B8/%E8%8B%B1%E8%AF%AD/life-imprisonment
 Cheng, H., & Ma, L. (2009). White collar crime and the criminal justice system. Journal of Financial Crime, 16(2), 166–179. https://doi.org/10.1108/13590790910951849
 Chinese nanny Mo Huanjing executed for arson killings. (2018, September 21). BBC News. https://www.bbc.com/news/world-asia-china-45598155
 Immigration and Refugee Board, & Research Directorate. (1996, March 1). Refworld | China: Information on the penalty for arson in Guangdong Province in cases where the offence pertains to the individual’s private residence. Refworld; Canada: Immigration and Refugee Board of Canada. https://www.refworld.org/docid/3ae6ac6744.html
 Guo, Z., & Ma, R. (n.d.). Life Imprisonment in China: Law and Practice. https://law.unimelb.edu.au/__data/assets/pdf_file/0009/3921561/Guo_Zhiyuan.pdf
 Jiao, X. (2005, August 26). Shanghai arsonists given severe punishment. Www.chinadaily.com.cn; China Daily. https://www.chinadaily.com.cn/english/doc/2005-08/26/content_472292.htm
 Life imprisonment of children in Asia. (n.d.). Archive.crin.org. Retrieved April 21, 2022, from https://archive.crin.org/en/home/campaigns/inhuman-sentencing/problem/life-imprisonment/life-imprisonment-children-asia.html
 Lu, H., & Zhang, L. (2005). Death penalty in China: The law and the practice. Journal of Criminal Justice, 33(4), 367–376. https://doi.org/10.1016/j.jcrimjus.2005.04.006
 Ruoyang, T., & Tianji, C. (2020). Smuggling of drugs by body packing: Evidence from Chinese sentencing documents. International Journal of Drug Policy, 103022. https://doi.org/10.1016/j.drugpo.2020.103022
 Zhang, J. (2021). Life Imprisonment System in China. Ieeexplore.ieee.org. Retrieved 21 March 2021, from https://ieeexplore.ieee.org/abstract/document/9407641
 Zhu, L. (2015). Punishing Corrupt Officials in China. The China Quarterly, 223, 595–617. https://doi.org/10.1017/s0305741015000764

China
Penal system in China